Louise H. Kellogg (November 18, 1959 – April 15, 2019) was an American geophysicist with expertise in chemical geodynamics and computational geophysics and experience in leading multidisciplinary teams to advance geodynamics modeling and scientific visualization. Kellogg was a Distinguished Professor at the University of California, Davis and director of the Computational Infrastructure for Geodynamics. She was also a major contributor to the Deep Carbon Observatory project of the Sloan Foundation.

Career 
Kellogg received her B.S. in Engineering Physics and B.A. in Philosophy from Cornell University in 1982. She followed with her Masters in Engineering and Engineering Physics in 1985 and her PhD in Geological Sciences in 1988 both from Cornell University. 

After receiving her Ph.D, she was named the Myron C. Bantrell Research Fellow in Geochemistry and Geophysics at the California Institute of Technology. She taught geology as an assistant and then associate professor at the University of California Davis from 1990 to 1998. From 1998, she was a professor in Earth and Planetary Sciences at UC Davis and served as the Department's Chair from 2000 to 2008. She also headed the Keck Center for Active Visualization in Earth Sciences (KeckCAVES), which provides expertise on scientific visualization of complex data and models. Kellogg was on the Executive Committee of the Deep Carbon Observatory and a member of its Synthesis Group 2019.

Research initiatives 
Kellogg's main research initiatives focused on understanding the flow in the Earth's mantle that drives plate tectonics, and observing and interpreting deformation in the Earth's crust. At U.C. Davis Kellogg used numerical methods to model aspects of mantle convection.  Kellogg also studied Earthquake Physics and Crustal deformation in order to assess seismic hazard of faults. She also worked on the visualization of geosciences data in an immersive environment.

Awards
From 1992 to 1996, Kellogg received a grant from the National Science Foundation as a Presidential Faculty Fellow. She was invited to present the Francis Birch lecture (Structure and Dynamics: An Earth Odyssey) at the American Geophysical Union in 2001. She was elected fellow of the American Geophysical Union in 2010 and the American Association for the Advancement of Science in 2012. She was elected to the American Academy of Arts and Sciences in 2013.

Publications
Kellogg published many influential papers over the course of her career. A selection follows.

References

Further reading

External links 
Memories of Louise (UC Davis)
The DCO Community pays tribute to Louise Kellogg

1959 births
2019 deaths
American geophysicists
Cornell University alumni
Fellows of the American Geophysical Union
Fellows of the American Academy of Arts and Sciences
Fellows of the American Association for the Advancement of Science
University of California, Davis faculty